The 1967 Boston University Terriers football team was an American football team that represented Boston University as an independent during the 1967 NCAA College Division football season. In its fourth season under head coach Warren Schmakel, the team compiled a 3–6 record and was outscored by a total of 151 to 114.

Schedule

References

Boston University
Boston University Terriers football seasons
Boston University Terriers football